Vojislav "Voja" Brajović (born 11 May 1949) is a Serbian actor.

Career
Brajović graduated from the Belgrade Faculty of Drama Arts in 1971. He has been member of the Yugoslav Drama Theatre since 1969.

He has been the recipient of many domestic theatre awards, including three Sterija awards for acting, an annual award of the Serbian National Theatre in Novi Sad, an annual award of CNP from Podgorica, and eight annual awards of the Yugoslav Drama Theatre in Belgrade.

He is best known for his portrayal of Tihi, the wisecracking World War II resistance fighter in the cult 1970s TV series Otpisani and Povratak otpisanih.

Political career
He served as the Minister of Culture in the Government of Serbia for the Democratic Party between 2007 and 2008. In July 2008, he was appointed to be an advisor on culture to the President Boris Tadić.

Personal life
He is married to actress Milica Mihajlović and they have one child. His son from the first marriage is Vukota Brajović, an actor as well. His daughter also from the first marriage is well-known actress Iskra Brajović. His youngest son from the second marriage to actress Milica Mihajlović is Relja Brajović, the singer and lead guitarist of the hardcore band Majak. 

Vojislav Brajović speaks English.

Selected filmography

Film

Television

Serbian dubs
{| class="wikitable"
!Year
!Film
!Role
|-
|2002
|Ice Age
|Diego
|-
|2003
|Finding Nemo
|Jacques
|-
|2006
|Ice Age: The Meltdown
|Master Shifu
|-
|2008
|Kung Fu Panda
|Master Shifu
|-
|2007
|The Simpsons Movie
|Russ Cargill 
|-
|2009
|Ice Age: Dawn of the Dinosaurs
|Diego
|-
|2010
|Toy Story 3
|Lotso
|-
|2011
|Kung Fu Panda 2
|Master Shifu
|-
|2012
|Ice Age: Continental Drift
|Diego
|-
|2015
|The Good Dinosaur
|Butch
|-
| rowspan="4"|2016
|Kung Fu Panda 3
|Master Shifu
|-
|Ice Age: Collision Course
|Diego
|-
|Zootopia
|Mayor Lionheart
|-
|Finding Dory
|Jacques

References

External links
 
 Government of Serbia

1949 births
Living people
20th-century Serbian male actors
21st-century Serbian male actors
Male actors from Belgrade
Serbian actor-politicians
Democratic Party (Serbia) politicians
Government ministers of Serbia
Serbian male actors
Serbian male stage actors
Serbian male television actors
Serbian male film actors
Serbian male voice actors
Dr. Branivoj Đorđević Award winners
Laureates of the Ring of Dobrica